Ole Hviid Jensen (born 5 November 1933) is a Danish former sports shooter. He competed at the 1956, 1964 and the 1968 Summer Olympics.

References

1933 births
Living people
Danish male sport shooters
Olympic shooters of Denmark
Shooters at the 1956 Summer Olympics
Shooters at the 1964 Summer Olympics
Shooters at the 1968 Summer Olympics
20th-century Danish people